Golitsyno is the name of several inhabited localities in Russia.

Modern localities
Urban localities
Golitsyno, Moscow Oblast, a town in Odintsovsky District of Moscow Oblast

Rural localities
Golitsyno, Kolyshleysky District, Penza Oblast, a village in Pleshcheyevsky Selsoviet of Kolyshleysky District in Penza Oblast
Golitsyno, Nizhnelomovsky District, Penza Oblast, a selo in Golitsynsky Selsoviet of Nizhnelomovsky District in Penza Oblast
Golitsyno, Rtishchevsky District, Saratov Oblast, a selo in Rtishchevsky District of Saratov Oblast
Golitsyno, Samoylovsky District, Saratov Oblast, a selo in Samoylovsky District of Saratov Oblast
Golitsyno, Tambov Oblast, a selo in Yurlovsky Selsoviet of Nikiforovsky District in Tambov Oblast

Alternative names
Golitsyno, alternative name of Galitsyno, a selo in Moldovsky Rural Okrug under the administrative jurisdiction of Adlersky City District under the administrative jurisdiction of the City of Sochi in Krasnodar Krai;

See also
 Gallitzin, Pennsylvania
 Gallitzin Township, Cambria County, Pennsylvania